In differential geometry, a fibered manifold is surjective submersion of smooth manifolds . Locally trivial fibered manifolds are fiber bundles. Therefore, a notion of connection on fibered manifolds provides a general framework of a connection on fiber bundles.

Formal definition
Let  be a fibered manifold.

Connection as a horizontal splitting
With the above manifold  there is the following canonical short exact sequence of vector bundles over :

A connection on a fibered manifold  is defined as a linear bundle morphism

A connection always exists.

Sometimes, this connection  is called the Ehresmann connection because it yields the horizontal distribution

 

At the same time, by an Ehresmann connection also is meant the following construction.  Any connection  on a fibered manifold  yields a horizontal lift  of a vector field  on  onto , but need not defines the similar lift of a path in  into . Let

Then  is called the horizontal lift of  if

A fibered manifold is a fiber bundle if and only if it admits such an Ehresmann connection.

Connection as a tangent-valued form
It yields uniquely the horizontal tangent-valued one-form

 

With this form, the horizontal splitting  reads

 

Connection as a vertical-valued form
The horizontal splitting  of the exact sequence  defines the corresponding splitting of the dual exact sequence

 

This splitting is given by the vertical-valued form

 

which also represents a connection on a fibered manifold.

Treating a connection as a vertical-valued form, one comes to the following important construction. Then any connection   on  induces the pullback connection

 

Connection as a jet bundle section
Let   be the jet manifold of sections of a fibered manifold , with coordinates . Due to the canonical imbedding

 

any connection   on a fibered manifold  is represented by a global section

 

of the jet bundle , and vice versa. It is an affine bundle modelled on a vector bundle

There are the following corollaries of this fact.

Curvature and torsion
Given the connection   on a fibered manifold , its curvature is defined as the Nijenhuis differential

 

Bundle of principal connections
Let  be a principal bundle with a structure Lie group . Therefore, it is represented by a global section of the quotient bundle , called the bundle of principal connections. It is an affine bundle modelled on the vector bundle  whose typical fiber is the Lie algebra  of structure group , and where  acts on by the adjoint representation.

 

where
 

It admits the canonical decomposition

 

where

 

is called the strength form of a principal connection.

See also
Connection (mathematics)
Fibred manifold
Ehresmann connection
Connection (principal bundle)

Notes

References

 
 
 
 
 

Connection (mathematics)
Differential geometry
Maps of manifolds
Smooth functions